Qiwllaqucha (Quechua qillwa, qiwlla, qiwiña gull, qucha lake, "gull lake", Hispanicized spelling Jeullacocha) is a mountain in the Andes of Peru, about  high. It is situated in the Huancavelica Region, Angaraes Province, Lircay District. Qiwllaqucha lies southwest of Hatun Rit'i and south of Wayra Q'asa.

References

Mountains of Huancavelica Region
Mountains of Peru